The Deputy Governor of Imo State is the political running-mate of the Governor. He serves as the second-in-command to the governor and he's also the second executive officer of the State.On 15 January 2020, Placid Njoku was sworn in as Deputy Governor of Imo State.

Qualifications 
As seen in the case of the Governor, The deputy Governor is nominated by the gubernatorial candidate of the political party and is expected to have the same qualification as the governor otherwise their election into office would be nullified. The Deputy Governor shall have the following qualifications:

a) Be above 35 years of age

b) Be a citizen of Imo State by birth

c) Be a member of a political party already registered by The Independent National Electoral Commission (INEC)

d) Possess a school Certificate level or its equivalent

Oath of office 
The oath of office is administered by the Chief Judge of the State or any Judge appointed to act in his stead. It's the same oath taken by the Vice President of Nigeria and Commissioners serving in the state

Duties 
The Deputy Governor assists the Governor in exercising primary assignments and is also eligible to replace a dead, impeached, absent or ill Governor as required by the 1999 Constitution of the Federal Republic of Nigeria.

Tenure 
The Deputy Governor is elected through popular vote on a ticket with the Governor for a term of four years. They may be re-elected for a second term but may not serve for more than two consecutive terms.

References 

Imo State politicians